The Campbell executive council was 3rd executive council of British Ceylon. The government was led by Governor Colin Campbell.

Executive council members

See also
 Cabinet of Sri Lanka

Notes

References

1841 establishments in Ceylon
1847 disestablishments in Ceylon
Cabinets established in 1841
Cabinets disestablished in 1847
Ceylonese executive councils
Ministries of Queen Victoria